The Spain national U-19 basketball team (Spain Youth national basketball team), is the representative for Spain in international basketball competitions, and it is organized and run by the Spanish Basketball Federation. The Spain national U-19 basketball team represents Spain at the FIBA Under-19 World Championship.

FIBA Under-19 World Championship

See also
Spanish Basketball Federation
Spain national youth basketball teams

References

Men's national under-19 basketball teams
Basketball